Samuel Ball FAPA (9 January 1933 – 9 December 2009) was an Australian researcher and academic in the field of education. He was employed by ETS (Educational Testing Service) in Princeton, New Jersey where he conducted research and carried out several major program evaluation studies, before returning to Australia where he held a number of positions including adjudicator for the game show Sale of the Century.  During his career he authored many books.

Education
His early education included time spent at Canterbury Boys' High School.

His initial qualification for teaching came from Balmain's Teachers College. Early in his career, he taught in a primary school in Sydney, before finishing his Sydney University Arts degree at night, and leaving for the US for further study. He completed his Ph.D. at University of Iowa, and went to New York where he worked at the Teacher's College, Columbia University.

Career
At ETS, Ball conducted what are today considered classic evaluations of the impact on learning of children's educational television, studying the effects of first, Jim Henson's Sesame Street and then The Electric Company for Children's Television Workshop.  In 1978, he left ETS to assume a professorship at the University of Sydney, New South Wales, Australia.  While at Sydney, from 1979 to 1984, Ball was editor of the American Psychological Association's Journal of Educational Psychology, the preeminent scholarly publication in the field of learning sciences.

Positions held:
Senior Research Psychologist, Educational Testing Service c. 1968–78
Professor of Education, University of Sydney 1978–93
Chair of Academic Board, University of Sydney 1988–91
Pro-Vice Chancellor (Community Affairs), University of Sydney 1991–93
Chief Executive, Victorian Board of Studies 1993–99
Professorial Fellow, Melbourne University 2000–03

Ball was the original adjudicator for Sale of the Century as it aired for the first time in Australia in 1980. He would write the questions and producers would pick questions they liked and card them for airing. In close decisions Tony Barber would ask 'Professor Sam' to adjudicate.

Consultancy work was completed for the UN in Africa and the Philippines.

Published works
Motivation in Education. Academic Press, March 1977. .
The Second Year of Sesame Street: A Continuing Evaluation. By BOGATZ, GERRY A., and BALL, SAMUEL. Princeton, NJ: Educational Testing Service, 1971.
Sesame Street summative research: some implications for education and child development. By Samuel Ball. ERIC Document Reproduction Service, 1972. ASIN B0006W2LS6.
Research on Sesame Street: Some implications for compensatory education. By Samuel Ball. Educational Resources Information Center, 1972. ASIN B0006W0VDS.
Encyclopedia of Educational Evaluation: Concepts and Techniques for Evaluating Education and Training Programs. By Scarvia B. Anderson, Samuel Ball, Richard T. Murphy. Review author[s]: Daniel L. Stufflebeam. The Journal of Higher Education, Vol. 47, No. 6 (Nov.–Dec., 1976), pp. 741–745. DOI 10.2307/1979133.

References

External links 
Sydney University
Melbourne University
Victorian Board of Studies

1935 births
2009 deaths
Academic staff of the University of Sydney